Voe is a village in Delting parish on Mainland, Shetland, Scotland. It is one of the three main settlements in Delting.  It is at the junction of the A968 and A970 roads.

The Sail Loft in Voe was once a store for sail fishing boats' gear and later a knitwear workshop, but is now the largest of the Shetland Amenities Trust's camping böds. It stands between the tideline and the bakery, in an idyllic pier side setting at the head of a mini-fjord. Suitable for larger parties, it makes an ideal central base for exploring the islands. It is open from 1 March to 31 October and sleeps 16 in two separate rooms which include a lounge and communal spaces. There is a separate dining kitchen.

The Pierhead bar & restaurant is near the harbour in Lower Voe and has hearty home cooking supplemented by daily local seafood specials.

References

External links

Shetland.gov.uk - Voe
Undiscovered Scotland - Voe

Villages in Mainland, Shetland